Amaxia theon is a moth of the family Erebidae. It was described by Herbert Druce in 1900. It is found in French Guiana, Venezuela, Ecuador, Peru and Bolivia.

References

Moths described in 1900
Amaxia
Moths of South America